The Australia Party was a minor political party established initially in 1966 as the Liberal Reform Group. As the Australia Party, it became influential, particularly in the landmark 1972 federal election when its preferences assisted the Australian Labor Party to victory—ending 23 years of Liberal/Country Coalition government.

The Australia Party grew out of the Liberal Reform Group, a group of members of the Liberal Party of Australia and Independents who opposed the party's policy of conscription and military involvement in the Vietnam War. The leading figure in this group was a businessman, Gordon Barton, who was assisted in the funding by Ken Thomas of TNT Transport and with the party organisation and branch establishment by Nick Gorshenin, Sydney shark meshing contractor and North Sydney Council alderman.

In 22 October 1966, when US President Lyndon B. Johnson visited Sydney, Gordon Barton and Ken Thomas sponsored a full-page advertisement in the Sydney Morning Herald lamenting the involvement of Australian troops in the Vietnam War. At that time no political party was opposed to Australian involvement in the war. Nick Gorshenin telephoned Gordon Barton that evening and they decided to form the Liberal Reform Group. They used their various contacts to establish the initial branches in Sydney, Melbourne, Brisbane, Newcastle and Gold Coast.

The "Australia Party" name was adopted in 1969, by which time it was also attracting disaffected Australian Labor Party (ALP) supporters. The party contested state and federal elections, achieving its best results in 1972. Though failing to win any seats, by directing its preferences to the ALP, it greatly assisted that party to win government for the first time since 1949. The Australia Party poll performance declined a little in 1974 and again in the 1975 federal election; however, by this stage it had replaced the Democratic Labor Party as the fourth party after Labor, Liberal and Country parties.

Subsequently, the party allied itself with the New Liberal Movement in the formation of the Australian Democrats for the 1977 federal election. However, a rump party continued on, fielding separate candidates in NSW, SA and Victoria in the 1977 election, in SA and Victoria in the 1980 election and the 1982 Flinders by-election. One candidate stood for the House of Representatives in Victoria in 1983. Relations between the rump party and the Australian Democrats were poor: in the 1977 election in South Australia, Australia Party preferences flowed to the Liberal Party rather than the Democrats, resulting in the Liberal Baden Teague defeating the Democrat Ian Gilfillan for the fifth and final Senate seat. The rump party merged into former Australian Democrat John Siddons' new Unite Australia Party (UAP) in December 1986, along with the Advance Australia Party. At the time The Canberra Times reported that the Australia Party had few remaining members, most of whom were in Victoria.

Significant figures in the Australia Party were Senator Reg Turnbull (elected as an independent, but Australia Party leader in 1969–1970), and journalist Alan Fitzgerald, then an elected member of the Australian Capital Territory Advisory Council. Two Australia Party members were elected to the newly formed Australian Capital Territory Legislative Assembly in 1975: Ivor Vivian and Maureen Worsley. Vivian joined the Australian Democrats, and was re-elected in 1979, but Worsley sat as an Independent from 1977 to the end of her term in 1979. Australia Party members who later entered federal parliament as Australian Democrats senators included Colin Mason (NSW), John Siddons (Vic), Sid Spindler (Vic) and Jean Jenkins (WA).

An important aspect of the Australia Party and later Australian Democrats is that they nullified and then overtook the minority influence of the Democratic Labor Party, which had wielded much influence in post-war federal and state politics. The Australia Party altered the power dynamics, and the Australia Democrats continued that role until they were succeeded by the Greens in the 2004 federal election.

Election results

House of Representatives

Senate

See also
 Liberalism
 Contributions to liberal theory
 Liberalism worldwide
 List of liberal parties
 Liberal democracy
 Liberalism in Australia

References

Australia 1969
Defunct political parties in Australia
Political parties established in 1969
1969 establishments in Australia
Political parties disestablished in 1986
1986 disestablishments in Australia
Liberal parties in Australia